Francisco Moreno Martínez (14 March 1931 – 23 January 2018) was a Spanish racing cyclist. He rode in the 1958 Tour de France.

References

External links
 

1931 births
2018 deaths
Spanish male cyclists
Place of birth missing
Sportspeople from the Province of Albacete
Cyclists from Castilla-La Mancha